Events from the year 2012 in the United Arab Emirates.

Incumbents
President: Khalifa bin Zayed Al Nahyan 
Prime Minister: Mohammed bin Rashid Al Maktoum

Events

May
 May 23 - The Iranian navy assists an American cargo ship that was attacked by pirates off the United Arab Emirates.

July
 July 15 - Saudi Arabia and the United Arab Emirates open new pipelines bypassing the Strait of Hormuz, the shipping lane that Iran has repeatedly threatened to close.
 July 29 - Ten more Islamists are arrested in the United Arab Emirates as part of a crackdown on dissidents, according to activists.

August
 August 15 - Saudi Arabia, Qatar and the United Arab Emirates urge their citizens to leave Lebanon over a series of recent kidnappings involving nationals from Syria, Turkey and Saudi Arabia.

Sports
 2012 Dubai Tennis Championships

Establishments 
 Careem
 Elite Residence
 Bab al-Qasr

 
Years of the 21st century in the United Arab Emirates
United Arab Emirates
United Arab Emirates
2010s in the United Arab Emirates